Snowfall on Judgment Day is the fourth studio release of the progressive metal band Redemption. Though the official American release date was October 6, 2009, the album was sold almost a month early exclusively at the 10th Annual Prog Power festival in Atlanta, Georgia (September 11–12). This is the only studio album with Greg Hosharian on the keyboards.

Track listing
All songs written by Nick Van Dyk.

Personnel

Band members
 Ray Alder - vocals
 Sean Andrews - bass
 Bernie Versailles - guitars
 Nick van Dyk - guitars, keyboards
 Greg Hosharian - keyboards
 Chris Quirarte - drums

Guest musicians
 James LaBrie - vocals on Another Day Dies

External links
Official Redemption website
Redemption's Official Myspace

References 

2009 albums
Inside Out Music albums
Redemption (band) albums
Albums with cover art by Travis Smith (artist)